Trebelno is a village in the Municipality of Mokronog-Trebelno in the historical Lower Carniola region of southeastern Slovenia. The municipality is now included in the Southeast Slovenia Statistical Region. 

The parish church, built on a slight elevation in the centre of the settlement, is dedicated to the Holy Cross and belongs to the Roman Catholic Diocese of Novo Mesto. It dates to the 16th century and was largely rebuilt in the late 18th century.

References

External links

Trebelno on Geopedia

Populated places in the Municipality of Mokronog-Trebelno